Turupupalli is a village located on the banks of the river Bahuda in Chittoor District in the state of Andhra Pradesh, India.

References

Villages in Chittoor district